Thomas Matthew Ray (Irish: Tomás Maitiú Ó Riabhaigh) was born in Dublin in 1801. He was the son of Matthew Ray, who was also from Dublin.

Early in life, Ray was involved in the Nationalist movement in Ireland. He became the secretary of the Trades Political Union in Dublin. It was here when Ray attracted the attention of Daniel O'Connell, who appointed Ray as secretary of the Loyal National Repeal Association, circa 1840.

While secretary of the Loyal National Repeal Association, Ray wrote correspondence through the association's existence. In 1842, he organised the Repeal Reading Rooms, and established them in several towns—the first of these being in Newcastle, County Limerick—on his mission.

In 1844, Ray was charged with exciting disaffection in Ireland and he, along with O'Connell and a number of other traversers, was condemned to imprisonment in Richmond Jail. Months later, the decision was reversed on appeal to the House of Lords in Britain.

Upon the breaking up of the Repeal association, Ray obtained the post of Assistant Registrar of Deeds in Ireland, and held that office for many years. He was the author of "A List of the Constituency of the City of Dublin Elections," which was published in 1835.

Ray died at number 5 Leinster Road, Rathmines, on 5 January 1881 in Dublin. He is buried in Glasnevin Cemetery.

References

Sources 
 A report of the proceedings on an indictment for a conspiracy in the case of the Queen v. Daniel O'Connell, John O'Connell, Thomas Steele, Charles Gavan Duffy, Rev. Thomas Tierney, Rev. Peter James Tyrrell, Richard Barrett, John Gray, and Thomas Matthew Ray, in Michaelmas term 1843, and Hilary term, 1844 by John Simpson Armstrong, and Edward Shirley Trevor 1844, Hodges and Smith, Dublin

External links 

catalogue.nli.ie (search for "Thomas Matthew Ray"

prism.talis.com/spd/items/140207

www.openlibrary.org (search for "Thomas Matthew Ray")

1801 births
1881 deaths
Irish nationalists